The 2010 Liberty Flames football team represented Liberty University in the 2010 NCAA Division I FCS football season. The Flames were led by fifth-year head coach Danny Rocco and played their home games at Williams Stadium and Lynchburg City Stadium. They were a member of the Big South Conference. They finished the season 8–3, 5–1 in Big South play to finish in a three-way tie for first.

Schedule

References

Liberty
Liberty Flames football seasons
Big South Conference football champion seasons
Liberty Flames football